Royal Township is a township in Ford County, Kansas, USA.  As of the 2000 census, its population was 105.

Geography
According to the USGS, it contains one cemetery, Ridenour.

References
 USGS Geographic Names Information System (GNIS)

External links
 US-Counties.com
 City-Data.com

Townships in Ford County, Kansas
Townships in Kansas